Marc Chouinard (born May 6, 1977) is a Canadian former professional ice hockey centre-winger who played six seasons in the National Hockey League (NHL).

Biography
Chouinard was born in Charlesbourg, Quebec City. As a youth, he played in the 1990 and 1991 Quebec International Pee-Wee Hockey Tournaments with a minor ice hockey team from Charlesbourg. 

Chouinard started his career in the Quebec Major Junior Hockey League in 1993. After two successful seasons, he was drafted in the second round, 32nd overall by the Winnipeg Jets during the 1995 NHL Entry Draft. He never played for the Jets, and on February 4, 1996 Chouinard and Teemu Selanne were traded to the Mighty Ducks of Anaheim in exchange for Oleg Tverdovsky and Chad Kilger. After three years with the Cincinnati Mighty Ducks, Chouinard was called up during the 2000–01 NHL season.

His uncle is Guy Chouinard, and he is a cousin of Éric Chouinard.

Career statistics

Regular season and playoffs

References

External links

1977 births
Living people
Beauport Harfangs players
Canadian expatriate ice hockey players in Switzerland
Canadian ice hockey centres
Canadian ice hockey right wingers
Cincinnati Mighty Ducks players
French Quebecers
Frisk Asker Ishockey players
Halifax Mooseheads players
HC Fribourg-Gottéron players
Ice hockey people from Quebec City
Kölner Haie players
Manitoba Moose players
Mighty Ducks of Anaheim players
Minnesota Wild players
Vancouver Canucks players
Winnipeg Jets (1979–1996) draft picks